HMS Fury was a  designed by Sir William Symonds, Surveyor of the Navy. She was ordered on 19 February 1844. After commissioning she sailed for the East Indies and participated in action against pirate junks near Vietnam. She then was in the Black Sea for the Russian War followed by the Second Opium War with China. She was sold for breaking in July 1864.

Fury was the eighth named vessel since it was used for a 14-gun sloop, launched by Lime & Mackenzie of Leith on 18 March 1779 and broken in April 1787.

Construction
She was ordered on 19 February 1844 from Sheerness Dockyard and her keel was laid in June 1845. She was launched on 31 December 1845. Following her launch she was towed to Liverpool to have her boilers and machinery fitted. She was then towed back to Sheerness and was completed for sea on 6 July 1847 at an initial cost of £51,688 including the hull at £24,764, machinery at £22,142 and fitting at £4,782.

Commissioned Service

First Commission
She was commissioned on 20 July 1847 under Commander James Wilcox, RN for service on the East Indies and China Station. She returned to Home Waters for a refit at Woolwich during 1851 costing £12,987.

Second Commission
She was commissioned on 4 December 1851 under the command of Commander Edward Tatham, RN for service in the Mediterranean. In 1854 she was sent to the Black Sea for the Russian War. In August 1854 Commander Ennis Chambers, RN took command. She returned to Home Waters for a refit at Portsmouth costing £23,838 during 1855–1856.

Third Commission
She was commissioned on 1 August 1856 under the command of Commander Charles Taylor Leckie, RN for service on the East Indies and China Station. With  was involved with boats at Fatsham on 1 June 1857. In July 1759 Commander William Andrew James Heath, RN took command. She was in action at the Pei Ho Forts on 26 June 1859. Commander John Crawford, RN took command on 2 January 1860. She returned to Home Waters to pay off on 19 June 1861.

Disposition
She was sold to Castle & Beech in July 1864 and broken at Charlton.

Notes

Citations

References
 Lyon Winfield, The Sail & Steam Navy List, All the Ships of the Royal Navy 1815 to 1889, by David Lyon & Rif Winfield, published by Chatham Publishing, London © 2004, 
 Winfield, British Warships in the Age of Sail (1817 – 1863), by Rif Winfield, published by Seaforth Publishing, England © 2014, e, Chapter 11 Steam Paddle Vessels, Vessels acquired since November 1830, Stromboli Class
 Colledge, Ships of the Royal Navy, by J.J. Colledge, revised and updated by Lt Cdr Ben Warlow and Steve Bush, published by Seaforth Publishing, Barnsley, Great Britain, © 2020, e  (EPUB)
 The New Navy List, conducted by Joseph Allen, Esq., RN, London: Parker, Furnivall, and Parker, Military Library, Whitehall, MDCCCXLVII
 The Navy List, published by His Majesty's Stationery Office, London

Paddle sloops of the Royal Navy
Sloop classes